The 2001 NCAA Division II Men's Soccer Championship was the 30th annual tournament held by the NCAA to determine the top men's Division II college soccer program in the United States.

Tampa (19-0-2) defeated defending champions Cal State Dominguez Hills in the tournament final, 2–1. 

This was the third national title for the Spartans, who were coached by Keith Fulk.

Bracket

Final

See also  
 NCAA Division I Men's Soccer Championship
 NCAA Division III Men's Soccer Championship
 NAIA Men's Soccer Championship

References 

NCAA Division II Men's Soccer Championship
NCAA Division II Men's Soccer Championship
NCAA Division II Men's Soccer Championship
NCAA Division II Men's Soccer Championship
Tampa Spartans men's soccer